The Tahoe Icemen were an Amateur Athletic Union-sanctioned junior ice hockey team in the Western States Hockey League and based in South Lake Tahoe, California. Home games were at South Lake Tahoe Ice Arena.

The team was founded by Chris Collins in 2012 as the Bay Area Seals and played out of the Cow Palace in Daly City, California. After scheduling issues concerning the continued use of the Cow Palace as a home rink, the franchise was moved to South Lake Tahoe to start the 2013–14 season with help from Greg Jamison, former President and CEO of the National Hockey League's San Jose Sharks, and Van Oleson, owner of Tahoe Sports Entertainment, which runs South Lake Tahoe Ice Arena.

History

Bay Area Seals (2012–2013)
After a start to the team's first season that saw them earn only 3 wins in their first 18 games, the Seals would finish strong and earn second place in the Pacific Division and their first Thorne Cup playoff appearance. The Seals would make a strong playoff run but would lose the Thorne Cup Championship game to Idaho Jr. Steelheads by a final score of 2-4.

By finishing as runner-up in playoffs, the Seals were invited to be the second of the WSHL's representatives (along with the Jr. Steelheads) at the 2013 United Hockey Union National Championship Tournament. In the three-game round-robin stage of the tournament, the Seals would lose to the Lake George Fighting Spirit of the Northern States Hockey League (NSHL) before beating the Hartland Hounds and Tennyson Chevrolets, both of the Midwest Junior Hockey League (MWJHL), to move on to the tournament's semi-final round. They beat the NSHL's Syracuse Stampede before losing the UHU National Championship game to the Jr. Steelheads by a score of 1-5.

Lake Tahoe (2013–2018)

The team would relocate to South Lake Tahoe and call themselves the Lake Tahoe Blue for the 2013–14 season after owner Chris Collins sold the team to Tahoe Hockey Partners, LLC. Collins continued on as the team's general manager for the remainder of the season. After a sub-par 2013-14 season, Collins would be replaced with Michael Richardson, who had also been hired as head coach, while Spencer Jamison, son of Greg Jamison, would take over the position of President. The 2014–15 season would also leave the Blue out of playoff position.

On April 20, 2015, it was announced that the team had changed its name to the Tahoe Icemen. On May 4, 2015, the Icemen announced the hiring of Tom Maroste as head coach and general manager for the 2015–16 season. After one season, in which the Icemen won only two games, Maroste was replaced by former professional hockey player Mickey Lang.

Prior to the 2018–19 season, the team announced it would be going dormant with the possibility of return for the 2019–20 season. It was claimed that the South Lake Tahoe Ice Arena was having maintenance issues and that during the dormancy, the ice plant could be repaired.

Season-by-season records

United Hockey Union National Championship Tournament
AAU Sanctioned Junior A National Championship
In 2013 & 2014, the Midwest Junior Hockey League (MWJHL), Northern States Hockey League (NSHL), and the Western States Hockey League (WSHL) advanced two teams each in the tournament.

References

External links
 Tahoe Icemen official site
 Official League Website

Ice hockey teams in California